Summerhill is a British children's television drama about the famously radical Summerhill School. written by Alison Hume and directed by Jon East. It was first broadcast on the CBBC Channel in January 2008 and was subsequently nominated for three children's BAFTA awards: Best Drama, Best Writer (for Alison Hume) and Breakthrough Talent (for Eliot Otis Brown Walters). It won the awards for writer & breakthrough nominations. The show launched the careers of a number of young actors, most notably Jessie Cave who went on to star as 'Lavender Brown' in Harry Potter and the Half-Blood Prince, and also Olly Alexander, Eliot Otis Brown Walters, and Holly Bodimeade.

The series was also shown on BBC One, and as a feature-length film on BBC Four.

Cast
 Eliot Otis Brown Walters as Ryan
 Holly Bodimeade as Maddy
 Jessie Cave as Stella
 Olly Alexander as Ned
 Sam Hoare as Phil

Episodes

Awards and nominations

References

External links
 
 

2008 British television series debuts
2008 British television series endings
BBC children's television shows
British high school television series
Television series about children
Television series about teenagers
Television series by Tiger Aspect Productions
Television series by Endemol